Elections were held in Slovakia's eight self-governing regions on 14 November 2009.

Six of the regional presidencies were won by centre-left Direction – Social Democracy (Smer), with one being won by Smer's national conservative allies, the People's Party – Movement for a Democratic Slovakia (ĽS-HZDS).  Bratislava was won by the centre-right Slovak Democratic and Christian Union – Democratic Party, having previously been held by ĽS-HZDS-backed Vladimír Bajan

Results

Presidencies

Councils

Nine further parties won one seat each.

Elections in Slovakia
Slovakia
November 2009 events in Europe
2009 in Slovakia
Regional elections in Slovakia